ACAA may refer to :

 Afghanistan and Central Asian Association
 Air Carrier Access Act
 Allegheny County Airport Authority
 American Collegiate Athletic Association
 Atlantic Collegiate Athletic Association